Vimy Ridge is a mountain ridge in east-central British Columbia, Canada. It has an area of 8 km2 and is a subrange of the Cariboo Mountains which in turn form part of the Columbia Mountains.

Vimy Ridge is named to commemorate the Battle of Vimy Ridge in World War I.

See also
List of mountain ranges

References

Cariboo Mountains
Ridges of Canada